The 1991 Dunhill Cup was the seventh Dunhill Cup. It was a team tournament featuring 16 countries, each represented by three players. The Cup was played 10–13 October at the Old Course at St Andrews in Scotland. The sponsor was the Alfred Dunhill company. The Swedish team of Anders Forsbrand, Per-Ulrik Johansson, and Mats Lanner beat the South African team of John Bland, David Frost, and Gary Player in the final. The final match was scheduled to consist of six individual matches (as in 1989 and 1990) but was reduced to three matches (as from 1985 to 1988) due to weather.

Format
The Cup was played as a single-elimination, match play event played over four days. The top eight teams were seeded with the remaining teams randomly placed in the bracket. In each match, the three players were paired with their opponents and played 18 holes at medal match play. Tied matches were extended to a sudden-death playoff only if they affected the outcome between the two teams.

Bracket

Round by round scores

First round
Source:

Quarter-finals
Source:

Semi-finals
Source:

Final
Source:

Lanner won on the first playoff hole.

Third place
Source:

Team results

Player results

References

Alfred Dunhill Cup
Dunhill Cup
Dunhill Cup
Dunhill Cup